Nataliya Chulkova (born 5 December 1977) is a Russian hurdler. Born in Kovrov, Vladimir Oblast, she competed in the women's 400 metres hurdles at the 2000 Summer Olympics.

References

1977 births
Living people
People from Kovrov
Sportspeople from Vladimir Oblast
Russian female hurdlers
Olympic female hurdlers
Olympic athletes of Russia
Athletes (track and field) at the 2000 Summer Olympics